The Amelia Gates Building is a historic two-story wood-framed Tudor Revival style commercial building in downtown Carmel-by-the-Sea, California. The building is significant as one of the two known designs by Dr. Amelia Gates. The building qualified as an important commercial building in the city's downtown historic district property survey and was registered with the California Register of Historical Resources on February 13, 2002. The building is occupied by the Kashmir Treasures and the MEUSE art gallery.

History

Dr. Amelia Gates, a pioneer pediatrician, designed and supervised the construction of the two-story commercial building as a retirement investment property. It was like those she had seen in her travels to Europe. It was built by Fred McCrary of Pacific Grove, California in 1928. It is located on Ocean Avenue & Monte Verde Street, at the west end of the Court of the Golden Bough Playhouse. The two-story wood-framed Tudor Revival style commercial building has a clinker brick veneer with textured cement stucco, with half-timbering on the upper floor. It has a parried steep-pitched roof, with a clinker brick exterior wall chimney. An open wood staircase leads to the top floor that was used as a studio apartment. It has three shop entrances along Ocean Avenue.

The building qualified for inclusion in the city's Downtown Historic District Property Survey, and was registered with the California Register of Historical Resources on December 13, 2002. The building is significant under the California Register criterion 3, in architecture as one of the two known designs by Dr. Amelia Gates. It has the design of the "Old World" character of Edward G. Kuster's Court of the Golden Bough Playhouse, which it is next to.

Amelia Gates

Dr. Amelia Levinson Gates (1866-1947), a pioneer San Francisco pediatrician. She was a native of Gdańsk, Germany, the daughter of Louis Levinson (1824-1877) and Rosalia Waldstein (1830-1904). She came to America when she was a child. Gates and her husband, Dr. Howard Gates met as student at Johns Hopkins University in Baltimore, Maryland. They shared a practice in San Jose, California. The had one child, Harold Keith Gates (1909-1978).

She first came to Carmel-by-the-Sea, California in 1910 where she constructed a cabin on a parcel the couple owned on El Camino Real. Her husband died in Rome in 1914. His brother, Egbert J. Gates (1869–1923), was also there with him in Rome at the time he died. Amelia returned to San Francisco where she pioneered in preventative care for children and helped establish the Florence Ward hospital in San Francisco. She retired in Carmel in 1922. There, she replaced the early cabin on Camino Real with a one-story vernacular style cottage of her own design, now called the Dr. Amelia Gates Cottage, located on Camino Real and 8th Avenue.

She died of cardiovascular disease, at her home on El Camino Real, on June 2, 1947, at the age of 81, in Carmel-by-the-Sea. Private services were held at the Paul Chapel in Pacific Grove and interment at the Oak Hill Funeral Home in San Jose. She left an estate valued at $147,420, and established a $5,000 fund for Stanford University School of Medicine to be known as the Howard Gates Loan Fund to aid medical students.

See also
 Edward G. Kuster

References

External links

 Downtown Conservation District Historic Property Survey
 Official website

1928 establishments in California
Carmel-by-the-Sea, California
Buildings and structures in Monterey County, California
History of the Monterey Bay Area